Sarita Reth (born 22 December 1994) is a Cambodian actress, model, presenter, and beauty pageant titleholder of Khmer origin, who was crowned Miss Universe Cambodia 2020. She represented Cambodia in Miss Universe 2020. As an actress, she is known for her role as Marima from Love9, a TV program that tackles sexual and reproductive health.

Life and work
Sarita began her career in beauty pageants and got her start in the cast of the TV program Love9. She is known to be an outspoken speaker on reproductive health among Cambodian youth. She is brand ambassador for several brands in Cambodia and has been cast in several films. She starred in the 2016 Cambodian horror film Mind Cage.

Achievements

|-
| 2016
| Youth Champion Award
| UNFPA Cambodia
| 
|
|

References

External links

1994 births
Living people
Miss Universe 2020 contestants
Cambodian beauty pageant winners
Cambodian female models